Per Nyqvist (born 21 May 1964) is a Swedish modern pentathlete. He competed at the 1992 Summer Olympics.

References

1964 births
Living people
Swedish male modern pentathletes
Olympic modern pentathletes of Sweden
Modern pentathletes at the 1992 Summer Olympics
Sportspeople from Gothenburg